In mathematics, Kronecker's congruence, introduced by Kronecker,  states that

where p is a prime and Φp(x,y) is the modular polynomial of order p, given by

for j the elliptic modular function and τ running through classes of imaginary quadratic integers of discriminant n.

References

Modular arithmetic
Theorems in number theory